Lavoo may refer to:
George LaVoo, American filmmaker
Lavoo Mamledar, Indian politician